The Valery Khalilov Moscow Suvorov Military Music College is one of the leading military music institutions in Russia. It is a separate branch of the Suvorov Military Schools in Russia, and the oldest of them all (opened 1937).

History 

On August 1, 1937, the conductor and director of music of the Central Military Band of the People's Commissariat of National Defense Major General Semyon Cherneysky founded the college, which was built as a boarding school for potential military musicians in the Red Army. Pupils ages of 12 and older at first spent 3 years in the boarding school.

Traditions 
Shortly before its 80th anniversary the "Valery Khalilov" honorific title was bestowed on the college on December 26, 2016 by Ministry of Defence General of the Army Sergey Shoygu - a day after the aircrash that killed Valery Khalilov and 91 others off Sochi while the Alexandrov Ensemble was on its way to perform for Russian troops deployed in Syria.

Special units

Band 
The school maintains a Marching Band (Russian: Марширующий оркестр) that is employed in ceremonial events hosted by the college, mostly made up of the musicians of the training band wing. The Suvorov College Band performs at the country's leading venues, including the Great Hall of the Moscow Conservatory, the Moscow International House of Music, and the State Kremlin Palace. The central training band wing of the college plays not only in Russia, but also in military tattoo events in Switzerland, Germany, France, Italy, England, Poland, and the Czech Republic. It has been a regular participant in the Spasskaya Tower military tattoo festival since 2006.

Corps of Drums 
The college is more famous internationally for its Corps of Drums, a participant in the Moscow Victory Parade of 1945 and a regular participant in Revolution Day (1938 to 1990), Victory Day (1965, 1985, 1990, 1995–2008, 2012-), and until 1968 May Day military parades. The corps is led by a Drum Major and has been, for about 8 decades, the formation that has been beating the drum cadences that precede the march past segment of all the parades held on Red Square of national importance. The Corps's instrumentation includes snare drums, fifes, trumpets, trombones, glockenspiels and during occasions, bass drums, tenor drums and chromatic fanfare trumpets. A Turkish crescent from the college was used as its symbol in the Revolution Day and Victory Day parades from 1975 to 1990, later replaced in 1995 by the college's colour guard squad carrying the collegiate Regimental Color (a new color was granted to the institution in 2008), preceded in parades by the Commandant of the College.

Fiesta Drummers' Ensemble 
The Fiesta Drummers' Ensemble of the school was created in 2005. Its current leader is Mikhail Melnik, a teacher of additional education at the school.  Over the years of its existence, the ensemble has been a participant in the Eurovision Song Contest 2009 and the International Festival of Military Orchestras "Tattoo on Stage" in Lucerne, Switzerland. In 2014, the ensemble took part in the closing ceremony of the Winter Olympics at Fisht Olympic Stadium in Sochi.

Commandants of the College 
 Lieutenant Colonel Leonid Bank (1937-1939)
 Boris Lvovich (1939-1940)
 Colonel Vladimir Zlobin (1940-1957)
 Colonel Nikolai Nazarov (1957-1958)
 Colonel Konstantin Kamyshov (1958-1960)
 Colonel Arkady Myakishev (1961-1970)
 Colonel Vladimir Volkov (1970-1975)
 Colonel Vladimir Detisov (1975-1982)
 Colonel Konstantin Romanchenko (1982-1986)
 Colonel Arkady Dzhagupov (1986-1993)
 Colonel Gennady Afonin (1993-2005)
 Colonel Alexander Gerasimov (2005–Present)

Alummi 
 Nikolai Mikhailov 
 Alexander Sladkovsky
 Valery Khalilov
 Serguei Kostiuchenko

Gallery

See also 
 Military Band Service of the Armed Forces of Russia

References 

Suvorov Military School
Music schools in Russia
1937 establishments in the Soviet Union